Jahandiz (also Romanized as Jahandīz and Jahāndīz) is a village in Qaflankuh-e Gharbi Rural District, in the Central District of Meyaneh County, East Azerbaijan Province, Iran. At the 2006 census, its population was 141, in 36 families.

References 

Populated places in Meyaneh County